Saint-Jean-de-Maurienne (or Sant-Jian-de-Môrièna) is a subprefecture of the Savoie department, in the region of Auvergne-Rhône-Alpes (formerly Rhône-Alpes), Southeastern France. In 2018, it had a population of 7,683.

It lies in the Maurienne, the valley of the river Arc. It was also an Episcopal See of Savoy during the Ancien Régime and again from 1825 to 1966. Its original name was simply Maurienne, or Moriana in Italian and Latin.

Geography

Location

The neighbouring communes of Saint-Jean-de-Maurienne are Saint-Julien-Mont-Denis, Jarrier, Hermillon, Villargondran, Albiez-le-Jeune, Albiez-Montrond, Saint-Pancrace and Pontamafrey-Montpascal.

Saint-Jean-de-Maurienne is close to: Albertville (59 Km), Chambery (72 Km), Grenoble (103 Km), Turin (137 Km), and Lyon (174 Km).

Climate
The climate is the alpine type because of the presence of the Alpine Massif.

Lines of communication and transport

Roads
Route nationale 6 (RN 6)
A43 autoroute
Col de la Croix de Fer

Railway

Saint-Jean-de-Maurienne is on the route of the future Lyon-Turin rail link. Homes, businesses, the current railway station and the rescue centre are affected by this project. The Lyon Turin Railway company (LTF) which manages the construction projects plans to build new railway station in the Sous-le-Bourg neighborhood, serving both the historic line and the new Lyon-Turin line. Geological and topographical investigations are underway. This project promises to be even more complex than that of the Channel Tunnel.

Public transport

Air
A heliport is available for the helicopter of the gendarmerie whose base is located in Modane.

Urbanism

Urban morphology
La Bastille, les Chaudannes and les Clapeys are the three main quarters.

Housing
The total number of dwellings in the commune is 4,240. Among such housing, 87.9% are principal residences, 5.4% are secondary homes and 6.7% are vacant dwellings. These accommodations have a share of 17.5% as individual houses, 79.3% as apartments and finally only 3.2% as dwellings of another type. The number of residents who own their homes is 37.9%. This is lower than the national average which adds up to nearly 55.3%. The number of tenants is 56.7% throughout the housing which is higher than the national average of 39.8%. It may be noted also that 5.4% of the inhabitants of the commune are people who are housed for free while at the level of the whole of the France the percentage is 4.9%. Still on all of the municipality housing, 3.5% are studios, 11.5% are two-room housing, 28.4% have three, 34.5% of dwellings have four rooms, and 22.1% of dwellings have five rooms or more.

Development projects

Toponymy
Locality named after John the Baptist, the precursor, son of Zechariah and Saint Elizabeth, cousin of Jesus, beheaded in 31 AD at the request of the Princess Salome.

Latin name: Mauriana

History

Saint-Jean-de-Maurienne has been the capital of the Maurienne Valley since the 6th century. After Saint Thècle reported from Alexandria (Egypt) the relics of St. John the Baptist which are the three fingers represented on the arms of the city, as well as on the Opinel knife blades, the town was raised to the rank of diocese by Guntram, grandson of Clovis I.

In 753, Grifo went to Italy to join the King of the Lombards, Aistulf, the most powerful opponent of his half-brother, the King of the Franks, Pepin the Short, but he was killed at Saint-Jean-de-Maurienne by the men of Pepin.

The oldest possessions of the Counts of Savoy were the counties of Maurienne, Savoy proper (the district between Arc, Isère, and the middle course of the Rhone), and Belley, with Bugey as its chief town.

The Duchy of Savoy, which had been a French-speaking province under the sovereignty of the Kingdom of Sardinia-Piedmont, was invaded by Revolutionary France, but restored to Piedmont in 1815. It became part of France in 1859, after the Second Italian War of Independence.

The Aix-les-Bains—Saint-Jean-de-Maurienne railway line opened in 1857.

In the early 1900s, the technological advances of Swiss hydroelectric power were originally the subject of intense stock market speculation on hydroelectric companies, which benefitted the Maurienne Valley with industrial facilities, while tourism took off.

Politics and administration
The city of Saint-Jean-de-Maurienne is a sub-prefecture of Savoie.

Political trends and outcomes

Traditionally, Saint-Jean-de-Maurienne has been a stronghold of the Socialist left, from the 1930s, due to the importance of its worker labor pool. Thus, Roland Merloz was the Socialist mayor from 1977 to 2008. But since the 1990s and sociological changes in the Maurienne (departure of factories, multiplication of tourist resorts, decrease of the population with an increase in representation of the elderly), the right-wing vote has increased. A UMP Councillor General, Pierre-Marie Charvoz, was elected in 2001, Nicolas Sarkozy was in the lead in the two rounds of the presidential elections of 2007, with respectively 33.5% and 56.62%, and in 2008, Pierre-Marie Charvoz won the communal elections.

Municipal government
The municipal Council of Saint-Jean-de-Maurienne has 29 members. It is composed of a mayor, seven assistants, four delegate councillors and seventeen councillors.

Roland Merloz, mayor of the city since 1977, announced his desire not to stand in 2008.

The following is the share of seats in the municipal council of Saint Jean de Maurienne:

In the municipal elections of March 2008, turnout of the first round was 65.46% with a total of 5,310 people registered to vote in the commune. The number of voters amounted to 3,476 voters which 3,393 expressed themselves. In the first round, the presidential majority list of Ensemble pour Saint Jean [Together for Sain Jean] with its head, Pierre-Marie Charvoz collected 46.95% of the vote or 1,593 votes. Followed by the list of "Saint Jean 10,000" led by Hervé Bottino, having received 34.39% of the vote or 1,169 votes. In third position, Saint Jean à venir [Saint Jean to come] list, headed by Christine Merlin got 13.26% of the votes or 450 votes. Finally the list Vivons Saint Jean [Live Saint Jean], led by Florence Arnoux Le Bras got 5.39% or 183 votes.

In the second round, the turnout was 68.57%. The number of voters amounted to 3,642 voters with 3,509 expressing themselves. In the second round, the presidential majority list of Ensemble pour Saint Jean with its head, Pierre-Marie Charvoz collected 55.40% of the vote or 1,944 votes and won 23 seats. The list of "Saint Jean 10 000" conducted by Hervé Bottino, received 44.60% of the vote or 1,565 votes and was therefore awarded 6 seats. The other lists were not present in the second round.

List of mayors

Twin towns – sister cities

Saint-Jean-de-Maurienne is twinned with:
 Bad Wildungen, Germany, since 1981
 Giaveno, Italy, since 2013

Population and society

Demography
In 2017, the commune had 7,746 inhabitants.

The population structure of the commune of Saint-Jean-de-Maurienne in 2017:

The total number of households in Saint-Jean-de-Maurienne is 3,729. These households are not all equal in numbers of individuals. Some of these households contain one, others two, three, four, five or even more than six people. Here, below, is the data as a percentage of the distribution of these households, compared to the total number of households.

Teaching
Kindergartens:

Aristide-Briand kindergarten  (public)
Des Clapeys kindergarten (public)
Des Chaudannes kindergarten(public)
Saint-Joseph kindergarten(private) - Closed in 2015

Primary schools:

Aristide-Briand primary school (public)
Des Clapeys primary school (public)
Des Chaudannes primary school (public)
Saint-Joseph Primary school (private) - Closed in 2015

Collèges:

Public college: Maurienne collège
Private college: Saint-Joseph collège - Closed in 2015

High schools:

Paul Héroult general and technology lycée
Paul Héroult professional lycée

Cultural events and festivities

In 2006, starting the stage of cycling's Tour de France to Morzine. The stage winner was Floyd Landis, after a  stage.
Festival of music, Saturday, 20 June 2009
Festival of Saint Jean, Saturday 27 and Sunday 28 June 2009
An outdoor cinema every Tuesday and entertainment every Thursday in July and August
Passage of multiple cycle races throughout the summer (Classique des Alpes junior, Tour des Pays de Savoie, Critérium du Dauphiné, Tour de France)
Festival of bread, Thursday, 6 August 2009
10km de Saint-Jean in October
Various entertainments throughout the year (theatre, concerts, etc.)
Salon des vins et saveurs, during the 3rd weekend in November, organized by the association verres et verines du cœur

Health

Sports
Saint-Jean-de-Maurienne is located close to some of the major Alpine passes, and of the Les Sybelles ski area and the Vanoise National Park. Activities are available for nature and sports enthusiasts, both hikers and cyclists, as well as skiers. Saint-Jean-de-Maurienne provides access to the Croix-de-Fer, the Télégraphe, the Lautaret, the Grand Cucheron, the Madeleine, the Glandon, the Iseran, Mont Cenis and the Galibier mountain passes. The city regularly hosts major cycling races such as the Tour de France or the Critérium du Dauphiné. The Tour de France came to the commune during the 2006, 2010, and 2012 races. The 2015 Tour de France is due to have a stage finish in the commune on 23 July, at the end of stage 18. The following day, it will also be the departure point for stage 19.

Media
Local television:

TV8 Mont-Blanc - La Fibre Mauriennaise
Maurienne TV

Local radio:

Economy

Income of the population and taxation

Employment
The unemployment rate for the commune, in 1999, amounted to 8.8%, with a total number of 359 unemployed. The workforce between 20 and 59 years stood at 84%, which is higher than the national average at 82.2%. There were 46% of people employed versus 19.1% of retirees, whose number is slightly higher than the average national (18.2%). There were 21.9% of people of school age and 13% of people without activity.

Businesses in the agglomeration

Alcan (ex-Pechiney): Currently, an important activity of production of aluminium by electrolysis of alumina still exists thanks to a Trimet France factory. The factory celebrated its 100th anniversary in 2007.

Commerce
With tourism growing through the winter sport resorts and the proximity of the major passes of the Alps and of the Vanoise National Park, local commerce is a new dynamic.

Local culture and heritage

Places and monuments

Medieval period

Le Tabellion or Correrie: House of the judge Corrier, appointed jointly by the Count of Savoy and the Bishop. Built after the revolt of Arves in 1326.
The Rue du Collège: A medieval street, last example of shops from the 15th and 16th centuries.

Contemporary period

The Gérard Philipe Theatre: Typical Architecture of the 1930s.

Religious monuments

The : A singular mixture of styles and periods. Its origin dates back to the 11th century. Classified as an historical monument in 1906.
The crypt: Built in the early Romanesque period and rediscovered in 1958.
The choir stalls in the cathedral: Completed in 1498, this masterpiece of Gothic art in walnut is attributed to Pierre Mochet.
The cloister: located between the cathedral and the refectory of the canons, its origin dates back to 1450. Classified as an historical monument in 1933.
The bell tower: A former capitular keep having lost its Gothic spire and its four pinnacles in 1794.
Notre-Dame church: The old parish church, now closed to the public, its origin dates back to the 11th century. The bell tower, today separated from the church, was the entrance.
Palace of the Bishops of Maurienne or former bishop: redesigned in the 18th century and classified municipal building since 1905. The grand salon is a beautiful example of Baroque art.
Chapel of Bonne Nouvelle: A pilgrimage place in Baroque style with ex-votos. Orientation table.
Chapel of St. Joseph's college (137, Rue du Collège). A Baroque chapel situated in St. Joseph's college (formerly college Lambertain, founded in 1534)

Green spaces

The Clos Carloz and the recreation area of the Combe are the main green spaces in the city. There is also the Garden of Europe and the Saint Ayrald Garden.

Gastronomy

Cultural heritage
The commune has several museums:

Museum of costumes and folk traditions: Evidence of life in the Maurienne past
The Opinel Museum: The history of the famous small knife designed in 1890 by Joseph Opinel and used on all continents
Mont Corbier Museum: The history of the liqueur, the still to the invention of Mont Corbier by Abbot Guille in 1888

Notable cultural associations:

Green and floral spaces
In 2014, the commune of Saint-Jean-de-Maurienne has the "Floral City" label with "three flowers" awarded by the National Council of floral cities and villages of France in the Concours des villes et villages fleuris.

Personalities linked to the commune
Born in the commune:

Circa. 650–750, Saint Thomas of Farfa or Thomas of Maurienne, Abbot of Farfa Abbey. Celebrated on 10 December.
, author of Noelz in Franco-Provençal printed in Lyon in 1555.
 (1762-1836),  (1828-1836).
François-Emmanuel Fodéré (1764-1835), creator of forensic medicine (a statue adorns Place Fodéré in the city centre).
 (1872-1960), creator of the Opinel knife.
 (1884-1936), politician.
Pierre Balmain (1914-1982), fashion designer.
Jean Baghe (1927-1992), militant worker, Christian and Socialist of the Maurienne Valley.
, (1937-1973), journalist and designer, French pamphleteer.
Catherine Sola (1941-2014), actress.
Jean-Noël Augert, born in 1949, alpine skier.
Hubert Déquier, born in 1952, French poet and writer.
, born in 1970, actor.
Damien Saez, born in 1977, singer, author, composer, performer.
Jean-Pierre Vidal, born in 1977, alpine skier.
, sports journalist.
Gérald Nguyễn, actor.
Jean-Baptiste Grange, born in 1984, alpine skier, specialist of the technical disciplines of skiing and especially slalom.

Other personalities:

 from the 6th century to 1966
, Calabrian painter and sculptor, living in Saint-Jean-de-Maurienne

Heraldry

See also
 Opinel knife
 Col de la Croix de Fer
 Agreement of St.-Jean-de-Maurienne
 Communes of the Savoie department

Bibliography

Work of the society for the history and archaeology of Maurienne

References
   & passim
 Besson, Memoires pour l'histoire ecclésiastique des diocèses de Genève, Tantaise, Aoste et Maurienne, Nancy, 1739; new ed. Moutiers, 1871

External links

 Town council website
 Picture of Saint-Jean-de-Maurienne Cathedral

 
Communes of Savoie
Subprefectures in France